New Cascadia Traditional is a gluten-free bakery in Portland, Oregon.

Description 
New Cascadia Traditional is a gluten-free bakery in southeast Portland's Hosford-Abernethy neighborhood. According to Nicholas DeRenzo of Yahoo! Life, the business is "all about non-traditional flours—such as millet, tapioca, sorghum, teff, and brown rice". The menu has included bagels, breads (including baguettes, challah, hoagie rolls, and sandwich loaves), cheddar-chive biscuits, cakes, cinnamon rolls, cookies, doughnuts, maple bars, pizzas, potato pancakes, and sandwiches. The bakery has also offered vegan options.

History 
New Cascadia Traditional is Portland's first gluten-free retail bakery. Spouses and co-owners Chris Gumke and Teresa Atkins started the bakery in 2007. Initially, the couple sold products at farmers' markets (including the Portland Farmers Market) before opening a brick and mortar shop in southeast Portland in 2008. The business has been featured in an episode of Cupcake Wars.

Reception 

Allison Jones and Tuck Woodstock included the bakery in Portland Monthly's 2014 "Essential Gluten-Free Food & Drink Guide". In 2020, Nicholas DeRenzo included New Cascadia Traditional in Yahoo! Life's list of "8 Specialty Bakeries That Ship Bread Nationwide", in which he wrote, "Luckily, a dedication to whole grains, naturally fermented starters, and no preservatives yields loaves that are surprisingly Old World in their texture and taste. If your local grocery store has a limited gluten-free selection, you'll want to fill your freezer with New Cascadia's baguettes, buns, egg-free challahs, and crusty loaves."

Cami Hughes included the business in Portland Monthly 2021 overview of "The Top-Tier Gluten-Free Bakeries in Town" and recommended the maple bar donut. Sararosa Davies and Pechluck Laskey included New Cascadia Traditional in Eater Portland 2022 list of "Portland’s Knockout Gluten-Free Restaurants and Bakeries". The Food Network has said the bakery "has become a favorite among the vegan and gluten-free communities in Portland".

See also

 List of bakeries

References

External links 

 
 New Cascadia Traditional Bakery at Zomato

2007 establishments in Oregon
Bakeries of Oregon
Gluten-free diet
Hosford-Abernethy, Portland, Oregon
Restaurants established in 2007
Restaurants in Portland, Oregon